Nina Tangri is a Canadian politician who was the Ontario Associate Minister of Small Business and Red Tape Reduction from June 2021 until June 2022. She was elected to the Legislative Assembly of Ontario in the 2018 provincial election. She represents the riding of Mississauga—Streetsville as a member of the Progressive Conservative Party of Ontario.

Tangri previously ran as the Progressive Conservative Party of Canada candidate for Mississauga Centre in the 2002 federal election, as the Conservative Party of Canada candidate for Mississauga—Streetsville in the 2004 federal election, as an Ontario Progressive Conservative candidate for Mississauga West in the 2003 provincial election, and as an Ontario Progressive Conservative candidate for Mississauga—Streetsville in the 2007 and 2014 provincial elections.

Candidacy for Speaker 
On June 23, 2022, the day before the swearing-in of the new Ford Ministry, it was reported in the media that Tangri planned to run to be Speaker of the Legislature. Parm Gill assumed her cabinet position the next day.

On August 8, 2022, MPPs re-elected incumbent speaker Ted Arnott by secret ballot, despite the Premier's tacit endorsement of Tangri. This followed accusations from the Official Opposition that Government House Leader Paul Calandra "threatened to strip" the party of three presiding officer and various committee chair roles should they not support her.

The Ontario NDP currently have one presiding officer position.

Electoral record

References

Progressive Conservative Party of Ontario MPPs
21st-century Canadian politicians
21st-century Canadian women politicians
Living people
Politicians from Mississauga
Women MPPs in Ontario
People from South Yorkshire
English emigrants to Canada
Conservative Party of Canada candidates for the Canadian House of Commons
Canadian politicians of Indian descent
Canadian expatriates in England
1965 births